Hamilton East may refer to:

Australia
 Hamilton East, New South Wales, a suburb of Newcastle, New South Wales

Canada
 Hamilton East (electoral district), a former federal electoral district in Ontario
 Hamilton East (provincial electoral district), a former provincial electoral district in Ontario
 Hamilton East—Stoney Creek, a federal and provincial electoral district in Ontario

New Zealand
 Hamilton East, New Zealand, a suburb in Hamilton
 Hamilton East (New Zealand electorate), a parliamentary electorate

United Kingdom
 Lanark and Hamilton East (UK Parliament constituency), a county constituency of the British House of Commons
Hamilton North and East (ward), electoral ward in Scotland